Jeremy Butler may refer to:

Jeremy Butler (American football), wide receiver
Jeremy Butler, the CEO of Iraq and Afghanistan Veterans of America
Jeremy G. Butler, scholar of film and television studies as well as an acoustic music radio show host in the United States